Signal recognition particle receptor subunit beta is a protein that in humans is encoded by the SRPRB gene.

The protein encoded by this gene has similarity to mouse protein which is a subunit of the signal recognition particle receptor (SR). This subunit is a transmembrane GTPase belonging to the GTPase superfamily. It anchors alpha subunit, a peripheral membrane GTPase, to the ER membrane. SR is required for the cotranslational targeting of both secretory and membrane proteins to the ER membrane.

References

Further reading